|}

The Woodlands Stakes is a Listed flat horse race in Ireland open to thoroughbreds aged three years or older. It is run at Naas over a distance of 5 furlongs (1,006 metres), and it is scheduled to take place each year in April.

The race was first run in 2003.

Records
Most successful horse (2 wins):
 Inxile - (2009, 2011)

Leading jockey (2 wins):
 Seamie Heffernan – Maarek (2013), Washington DC (2017)
 Wayne Lordan– Great Minds (2015), Mooneista (2021) 

Leading trainer (2 wins):
 Michael Halford -  Miss Emma (2003), Snaefell (2008) 
 Kevin Prendergast -  Abunawwas (2004), Velvet Flicker (2010) 
 David Nicholls - Inxile (2009, 2011)
 Aidan O'Brien – Guerre (2014), Washington DC (2017)

Winners

See also
 Horse racing in Ireland
 List of Irish flat horse races

References

Racing Post:

Flat races in Ireland
Naas Racecourse
Open sprint category horse races
Recurring sporting events established in 2003
2003 establishments in Ireland